Raymond Cilliers is a South African gospel and contemporary Christian  recording artist. His career began in 1993 with his debut album, Gloryland, which reached gold status in South Africa.

Career

Music 
In 1993, Raymond Cilliers stepped onto the South African Gospel Music scene. On the label Brettian.

Education
Raymond received a bachelor's degree in Ministry from Heritage of Faith Bible Institute through which he studied and then received an Honorary bachelor's degree from CFCI Bible Institute. He also became a lecturer at both schools for a total of seven years.

Philanthropy
Raymond's ministry has taken him not only across South Africa, but beyond South African borders like the USA.

Personal life 
Cilliers resides in Florida with his beautiful wife and two children.

Discography 
Raymond has released numerous studio, compilation and live albums.

Studio albums
 Gloryland (1994) 
 Lord I Thank You (1997)
 Suddenly Light (1999)
 Sacred Path (2001)
 The Sound of the Secret Place (2003)
 Lately (2005)
 Coming Home (2007)
 Choose Life - CD & DVD (2008)
 Most Beautiful Name (July 27, 2017)

Live albums 
 Muzik! Live Gospel featuring Imagine: Leon Ferreira, Mervis and Freddie Wessels - (2006)
 Emmaus Worship Experience (2008)

Compilation albums 
 Die Begin Jare... It Is Well - Volume 2 (2009)
 Die Begin Jare... Shekinah Glory - Volume 4 (2009)

References

External links 
 
 

1983 births
20th-century South African male singers
21st-century South African male singers
South African gospel singers
Living people
South African singer-songwriters
White South African people